Shahid Bahonar Kerman Stadium is a multi-purpose stadium, located in central Kerman, Iran. It is used mostly for football matches.  The stadium is able to hold 15,430 people and was opened in 2007. Shahid Bahonar Stadium is home venue of Azadegan League side, Mes Kerman Athletic and Cultural Club. It is named in honour of former Iranian Prime Minister, Mohammad-Javad Bahonar who was assassinated in 1981.

History
Mes Kerman announced in November 2003 that it has plans to build its own football stadium with a 45,000 capacity (later it was reduced to 15,430 by Kerman's Municipality) to be replaced with Salimikia Stadium. The building progress of the stadium was officially started on 13 July 2004 and was ends on 12 March 2007. The stadium was officially opened on 1 December 2007.

Building
The stadium is located on a site with an area of 54 acres. Tart paste of the stadium is also in accordance with international standards for the triple jump, length, and height, as well as throwing the disc, hammer, javelin and weight is capable.

Events
The stadium hosted 2014 AFC U-19 Championship qualification Group D's matches which was included Iran, Saudi Arabia, Lebanon and Tajikistan. Iran qualified for the final round as group's winner. The final match of 2013–14 Hazfi Cup was also hosted by the Shahid Bahonar Stadium.

Inauguration match
The opening ceremony of the stadium was held on 1 December 2007 but the first match held in the stadium was an Iran Pro League match against Pas Hamedan on 22 January 2008.

References

External links
Stadium information

Football venues in Iran
Sanat Mes Kerman F.C.
Buildings and structures in Kerman Province
Kerman